Rama Naamam/Ram Naam means "the name Rama/Ram",the poet Kabir wrote about Ram as non-form God. 
Rama's name is often chanted or sung within the many traditions of Hinduism. A popular mantra is Sri Ram Jai Ram Jai Jai Ram (often prefixed with "Om"), which was popularized in western India by Samarth Ramdas.

In Mahabharata, Shiva states that uttering "Rama" three times is equal to pronouncing the thousand other names of God.

Ram Naam in Guru Granth Sahib, sacred book and current guru of Sikhism is second most commonly used name for formless god after the name Hari.

"Ram Naam Satya Hai" is commonly chanted by Hindus while carrying a dead body to be cremated. This recitation implies that the dead body no longer sustains the truth (breath) which is Ram Naam.

Individuals connected to the mantra
The mantra was often used by Mahatma Gandhi.

Neem Karoli Baba encouraged the constant repetition of "Ram" in order to become closer to God, saying: "By taking the name of Ram, everything is accomplished."

Tyagaraja, a composer of carnatic music, regarded music as a way to experience the love of God. His songs were on Ram Naam.

Swami Ramdas is said to have attained Nirvana through constant repetition of "Om Sri Ram Jai Ram Jai Jai Ram". He established Anandashram, where this mantra is sung continuously from morning to night.

Aniruddha’s Universal Bank of Ram Naam

“Aniruddha’s Universal Bank of Ram Naam” (Head Office situated in Mumbai, India) is a unique bank which accepts “Ram” name instead of currency as deposits. The bank account holders write “Ram” in a specially designed book with image of Lord Hanumanji on each page with ultimate aim of bringing peace, inner bliss and strengthen destiny of the account holders to withstand obstacles in life. 
Shravan Bhakti (devotion in the form of listening) is one of the highest forms of bhakti (devotion) which can be achieved by writing “Ram”.  While writing “Ram” name, the eyes read the name, the hand writes the name and the mind automatically recites the mantra leading to internal listening. Hence ram naam book is considered as the easiest tool of devotion.

See also 
 Rama Nama Sankeerthanam
 Maha Mantra

References 

Hindu philosophical concepts
Bhakti movement